White Rock or White Rocks may refer to:

Places

Australia
Wedding Cake Rock, New South Wales
White Rock Conservation Park, Queensland
Albino Rock, Queensland, an island formerly known as White Rock
White Rock River (New South Wales)
White Rock, Queensland (Cairns Region), a suburb in Cairns, Queensland
White Rock, Queensland (Ipswich), a suburb in the city of Ipswich, Queensland

Canada
White Rock, British Columbia, Canada, a city
White Rock, Nova Scotia, Canada, an unincorporated community

United States
White Rock, Franklin County, Arkansas, an unincorporated community
White Rock, Washington County, Arkansas, an unincorporated community
White Rock, California, an unincorporated community
White Rock, Illinois, an unincorporated community
White Rock, Kansas, a former settlement
White Rock, Gorham, Maine, a village in Gorham, Maine
White Rock, Michigan, an unincorporated community
White Rock, Minnesota, an unincorporated community
White Rock, Missouri, an unincorporated community
White Rock, Nevada, a ghost town
White Rock, New Mexico, a census-designated place
White Rock, San Juan County, New Mexico, a Navajo settlement
White Rock, South Carolina, an unincorporated community
White Rock, South Dakota, a town
White Rock, Texas, a town
White Rock (Taconic Mountains), a ridgeline high point; also White Rocks, the southernmost summit on the same ridgeline
White Rock Township (disambiguation)
White Rock Mountains, Nevada
White Rock Lake, Dallas, Texas
White Rock Creek, running through Dallas
White Rock (DART station), Dallas
White Rocks National Recreation Area, Vermont
White Rocks Natural Area, a protected area in Boulder County, Colorado
White Rock (Wyoming), a mountain in the Wind River Range

Elsewhere
White Rock River, New Zealand
White Rocks Bay, Pembroke, Malta

Other
White Rock (film), a documentary about the 1976 Winter Olympic Games
White Rock (album), a soundtrack album to the White Rock film
White Rock Beverages, a company based in Whitestone, New York
Project White Rock, codename of a cross-platform game that is in development by RedLynx
White Rock Theatre, in Hastings, East Sussex, England
White Rock Battery, an artillery battery in Gibraltar
The White Rock: An Exploration of the Inca Heartland, 2001 travel book by Hugh Thomson
The White Rock (novel), 1945 novel by Denys Val Baker